Glean is the seventeenth studio album from New York City-based alternative rock band They Might Be Giants, released on April 21, 2015. It is composed entirely of releases from the first four months of the band's 2015 Dial-A-Song project.

Background
In late 2014, the band began advertising the relaunch of their Dial-A-Song service, which had its origins in the early 1980s when the band would record songs onto an answering machine and advertise the phone number. The service was eventually discontinued in 2006, but the band sought to restart it online. A modified version of the original phone number was reclaimed as well, and both outlets were updated every Tuesday with a new recording starting in December 2014.

Also announced in late 2014 was the return of Instant Fan Club, a year-long subscription service offered by the band upon each of their studio album releases since 2011. Among the products promised to members were free digital downloads of all Dial-A-Song releases, CD copies of the band's upcoming rock and children's albums, as well as LP copies of each for "Super President" tier members. This marked the announcement of the band's 17th (13th rock album) and 18th (fifth children album) albums.
In mid-February, They Might Be Giants announced details on their upcoming rock album, including the title, some tracks, and the release date. "Erase", which was released in January as the first Dial-A-Song track of 2015, was announced to be the lead single off Glean.

Release
Glean was released on April 20, 2015 in Europe on Lojinx and April 21 in America on the band's own Idlewild Recordings. CD and vinyl editions were included, along with digital releases of the album, and the original releases of the songs via the Dial-A-Song service.
Instant Fan Club members received CD copies of Glean upon its release. Super President tier members received copies with the booklet signed by both John Flansburgh and John Linnell.

Australian copies came with a bonus CD of the Flood Live In Australia album, containing the entire Flood album performed live in reverse running order.

Track listing

Personnel

They Might Be Giants
John Flansburgh – vocals, guitars, etc.
John Linnell – vocals, keyboards, woodwinds, etc.

Backing Band
 Marty Beller – drums, percussion
 Danny Weinkauf – bass
 Dan Miller – guitars

Additional musicians
 Dan Levine – trombone on 3, 4, 14
 Curt Ramm – trumpet on 3, 4, 14
 Stan Harrison – saxophones on 4, 6, 14
 Rob Moose – violins on 4, 6, 9

Production
 Pat Dillett – co-producer, mixing
 Jon Altschuler – engineer
 UE Nastasi – mastering
 Paul Sahre – design; space and fist illustrations
 Jason Fulford – photography
 Frank H. Netter – salivary glands illustration

Charts

References

2015 albums
Idlewild Recordings albums
Albums produced by Pat Dillett
They Might Be Giants albums
Lojinx albums